Tan Sri Datuk Seri Panglima Dr. Lee Lam Thye is a Malaysian politician and social activist of the Democratic Action Party (DAP). Lee was born on 30 December 1946 in Ipoh, Perak. He completed his secondary education at St Michael's Institution in Ipoh, Perak where he obtained his Senior Cambridge Certificate in 1965.

Career
He was the elected state legislative assemblyman for Bukit Nanas, Selangor from 1969 to 1974. Between 1974 and 1990, Lee served as the three-term and only Member of Parliament for Kuala Lumpur Bandar before it was abolished. Concurrently, he served a single term as state assemblyman between 1978 and 1982 for Serdang. His last political office prior to retirement in 1990 was as the Member of Parliament for Bukit Bintang.

Between 2000 and 2001, Lee was appointed as a member of the Malaysian National Economic Consultative Council (MPEN) and chairman of Mapen II National Unity Committee. He was also elected a member of the Human Rights Commission of Malaysia from 2000 to 2002. Following that, Lee served as a member of the Improvement, Transportation and Management Royal Commission of the Royal Malaysian Police from 2004 to 2005.

For almost 12 years, Lee was a member of the Kuala Lumpur City Hall Advisory Board. He served on the board from 1996 to February 2008. From 2005 to June 2008, he was also chairman of the National Service Training Programme Council.

Other offices or posts that he has held during his decorated career includes:
 Chairman of the National Institute of Occupational Safety and Health, Ministry of Human Resources, Malaysia
 Deputy chairman and executive officer of the Malaysia Crime Prevention Foundation (MCPF)
 Vice-president of the Association for Preventing Drugs Malaysia (PEMADAM)
 Member of the board of trustees of the 1Malaysia Foundation
 Chairman of the Organ Donation Awareness Action Committee, Ministry of Health, Malaysia
 Member of Mental Health Promotion Advisory Council, Ministry of Health, Malaysia
 Member of the Employees Provident Fund (Malaysia)
 Member of the advisory board of the Public Complaints Bureau, Prime Minister's Department (Malaysia)
 Chairman of the board of trustees of S P Setia Foundation
 Member of the board of directors of Open University Malaysia
 Member of the board of trustees of the MAA-Medicare Kidney Charity Fund

Awards
 Outstanding Young Malaysian Award by Jaycees Malaysia (1986)
 Onn Ja'afar Lifetime Achievement Award by Malaysiana Muda (1991)
 Consumer Personality Award (1996)
 Rotary Paul Harris Fellowship Award (1996)
 Sree Narayana Guru Award by Guru Dharma Society (1997)
 Honorary Doctorate in Law from University of Science, Malaysia (USM) (2000)
 Prime Minister's Excellence Award (2001)
 Lions International Melvin Jones Fellowship (2002)
 Honorary Doctorate in Letters from University of Malaysia, Sarawak (UNIMAS) (2002)
 Langkawi Award (2002)
 Healthcare Services Award by Malaysian Medical Association (MMA) (2004)
 Tokoh Keselamatan dan Kesihatan Pekerjaan Kebangsaan (2005)
 Sathya Sai Life Humanitarian Award (2006)
 Anugerah Perpaduan Kebangsaan (2008)
 Toastmasters International Communication and Leadership Award by Toastmasters International District 51 (2009)
 Pinel Award (2010)
 BrandLaureate Brand Icon Leadership Award (2011)
tokoh maulidurasul 2019

Honours
  :
  Companion of the Order of the Defender of the Realm (JMN) (1993)
  Commander of the Order of Loyalty to the Crown of Malaysia (PSM) – Tan Sri (2002)

  :
  Grand Commander of the Order of the Territorial Crown (SMW) – Datuk Seri (2009)
  :
  Knight Commander of the Order of the Perak State Crown (DPMP) – Dato' (1995)
  :
  Grand Commander of the Order of Kinabalu (SPDK) – Datuk Seri Panglima (2011)
  :
  Knight Commander of the Order of the Crown of Selangor (DPMS) – Dato' (2003)

Literature
 Nasionalis humanis. (1994) 
 NIOSH: upgrading safety standards in collaboration with industry. Fmm Seminar On Promoting Occupational Safety & Health Awareness In The Manufacturing Sector (1996)
 Keluarga asas pembangunan bangsa. (1996)
 Pembangunan dan alam sekitar. (1996)
 Program Khidmat Sosial Negara: Melahirkan bangsa Malaysia yang berwawasan. (1996)
 KWSP dan pembangunan sosial masyarakat. (1996)
 李霖泰诤言集 (1996) 
 Sekolah wawasan: pengukuh perpaduan dan keperibadian. (1997)
 Occupational safety and health at worksite. (1997)
 Mengantarabangsakan Bahasa Melayu: agenda utama alaf mendatang. (1997)
 Perkhidmatan cekap melalui penswastaan. (1997)
 Membudayakan amalan kebersihan. (1997)
 Isu moral kakitangan kerajaan. (1998)
 Kecelakaan pemandu. (1998)
 Menangani masalah pendatang tanpa izin. (1998)
 As I was saying: viewpoints, thoughts and aspirations of Lee Lam Thye. (1998) 
 Akta gangguan seksual. (1999)
 Graduan universiti penguat perpaduan negara. (1999)
 Memurnikan Masyarakat. (2000)
 Perpaduan Secara Sukarela. (2000)
 Pulanglah Cendekiawan Negara. (2001)
 A strong maintenance culture certainly lacking in Malaysia. (2009)
 My Reflections on OSH. (2006) 
 Gagasan 1Malaysia melalui landasan seni & budaya (2010)

References

External links
 Profile at Media Prima

1946 births
Living people
People from Perak
People from Ipoh
Malaysian politicians of Chinese descent
Malaysian people of Cantonese descent
Malaysian activists
Democratic Action Party (Malaysia) politicians
Members of the Dewan Rakyat
Members of the Selangor State Legislative Assembly
Grand Commanders of the Order of Kinabalu
Companions of the Order of the Defender of the Realm
Commanders of the Order of Loyalty to the Crown of Malaysia
21st-century Malaysian people
Knights Commander of the Order of the Crown of Selangor